The 1972 Missouri Tigers football team was an American football team that represented the University of Missouri in the Big Eight Conference (Big 8) during the 1972 NCAA University Division football season. The team compiled a 6–6 record (3–4 against Big 8 opponents), finished in a tie for fourth place in the Big 8, and was outscored by opponents by a combined total of 311 to 219. Al Onofrio was the head coach for the second of seven seasons. The team played its home games at Faurot Field in Columbia, Missouri.

The team's statistical leaders included Tommy Reamon with 454 rushing yards, John Cherry with 861 passing yards and 1,094 yards of total offense, Jon Bastable with 362 receiving yards, and Greg Hill with 61 points scored.

Schedule

References

Missouri
Missouri Tigers football seasons
Missouri Tigers football